Dirk van der Aa (1731 – 23 February 1809) was a Dutch rococo painter who is best known for his allegorical work.

Life
He was born in The Hague, and first apprenticed to Johann Heinrich Keller, and then to Gerrit Mes with whom he would later start a workshop; they specialized in grisaille decorative paintings. He counted Evert Morel, Cornelis Kuipers, Johan Christiaan Roedig and Andries van der Aa amongst his students.  He died in his home city of The Hague.

Works by van der Aa

 Allegory of Summer: Cherubs disporting in a landscape (1775), part of a pair with Allegory of Autumn view at Artnet
 Spielende Putten auf Wolken (Playing Putti on Clouds) (1773)
 An overdoor: Putti desporting on clouds by a vase on pedestal (1773) view at Artnet
 Spielende Putten, Allegorie des Sommers (Playing Putti, allegory of summer), attributed to Dirk van der Aa view at Artnet

References

External links
Information at the Netherlands Institute for Art History

1731 births
1809 deaths
18th-century Dutch painters
18th-century Dutch male artists
Dutch male painters
19th-century Dutch painters
Artists from The Hague
19th-century Dutch male artists